In ancient Mesopotamian religion, Lugal-irra and Meslamta-ea are a set of twin gods who were worshipped in the village of Kisiga, located in northern Babylonia. The Great Twins were regarded as guardians of doorways and they may have originally been envisioned as a set of twins guarding the gates of the Underworld, who chopped the dead into pieces as they passed through the gates. During the Neo-Assyrian period, small depictions of them would be buried at entrances, with Lugal-irra always on the left and Meslamta-ea always on the right. They are identical and are shown wearing horned caps and each holding an axe and a mace. They are identified with the constellation Gemini, which is named after them.

See also
 Castor and Pollux
 Alexiares and Anicetus, twin-sons of Heracles/Hercules and Hebe/Juventas; alongside their father, they are the guardians of the gates of Mount Olympus.  
 Janus
 Nio
 A-un
 Gozu and Mezu

References

Bibliography

Mesopotamian gods
Fictional twins
Gemini (constellation)
Western astrology
Astronomical myths